Kyeremateng or Kyerematen is a surname. Notable people with the surname include:

Basty Kyeremateng (born 1987), Italian footballer
Gabriel Kyeremateng (born 1999), German-Ghanaian footballer
Giovanni Kyeremateng (born 1991), Italian footballer
Nigel Kyeremateng (born 2000), Italian footballer

John Alan Kyerematen  (born 1955), Ghanaian politician
Martin Kyerematen, Ghanaian politician